First Horizon Corporation is a bank holding company based in Memphis, Tennessee. Its banking subsidiary, First Horizon (formerly First Tennessee), is the largest bank in Tennessee and the fourth largest regional banking company in the Southeast. Founded in 1864, and is dedicated to helping their clients, communities and associates unlock their full potential with capital and counsel. The company provides a comprehensive suite of financial products and services including consumer, small business and commercial banking and lending, mortgage services, wealth management, insurance and trading services. In November 2019, First Horizon Corporation and Lafayette, Louisiana-based IberiaBank Corporation agreed to merge. The merger closed July 2, 2020. The combined bank is based in Memphis, Tennessee, and uses the First Horizon name.

History
Frank S. Davis founded First National Bank, the first nationally chartered bank in Memphis after passage of the National Banking Act of 1863. The charter was received on March 25, 1864, during the American Civil War.

The yellow fever epidemics in Memphis from 1867 through 1878 halted growth. The bank acquired German Bank in 1895. In 1914, the bank participated in the organization of the Federal Reserve Bank of St. Louis. The bank merged with Central-State National Bank in 1926. In 1942, the bank opened its first suburban branch and by 1952, it operated 7 branches. In 1964, the bank moved into a new 23-story headquarters in downtown Memphis. By 1967, the bank was the largest bank in the Mid-South, when it was reorganized as the First National Holding Company. In 1971, the First Tennessee National Corporation was formed to allow the company to acquire other Tennessee banks.

Allen B. Morgan was named president in 1960, chief executive in 1967, and chairman in 1969.

In 1981, the company founded First Express, a check clearing business.

During the 1980s, the company also expanded into mortgage brokerage, mortgage loan origination, and insurance.

In 1993, the bank acquired MNC Mortgage.

In 1994, the bank acquired Peoples Commercial Services Corporation.

In 1999, to reflect its diversification, the bank adopted the slogan, All Things Financial.

In 2004, the company changed its name to First Horizon National Corporation to reflect its interstate growth.

In May 2007, the company acquired Republic Mortgage, based in Las Vegas.

In September 2007, the company sold 34 branches outside of Tennessee, including 13 branches to M&T Bank, 10 branches to Sterling Bank, 9 branches to Fifth Third, and 2 branches to FMCB Holdings.

In June 2008, the company sold its residential-mortgage origination and servicing business to Metlife.

In November 2008, the United States Department of the Treasury invested $866 million in the company as part of the Troubled Asset Relief Program and in December 2010, the company repurchased the investment from the Treasury.

On June 7, 2013, the bank acquired Mountain National Bank, which suffered from bank failure.

In October 2015, the company acquired TrustAtlantic Bank.

In December 2017, the company acquired Capital Bank Financial for $2.2 billion. Capital Bank later announced it would lease two floors of the 10-story One Glenwood in Raleigh. The lease included a sign on the building.

First Horizon announced on June 11, 2019, that in fall of 2019 it would have the same name in all of its markets. The change encompassing First Tennessee Bank, Capital Bank, FTB Advisors and FTN Financial became effective at the close of business on October 25, 2019, with signage changes expected to be complete throughout those holdings by early 2020.

In November 2019, First Horizon Corporation and Lafayette, Louisiana-based IberiaBank Corporation agreed to merge. The combined bank is based in Memphis, Tennessee, and uses the First Horizon name. The merger closed July 2, 2020, with $79 billion in assets and $58 billion in loans.

In a regulatory filing December 1, 2020, the corporation announced it had dropped "National" from its name. Effective November 30, 2020, it had become First Horizon Corporation.

On February 28, 2022, Toronto-based TD Bank Group announced that it would acquire First Horizon Corporation in an all-cash deal of US$13.4 billion. TD will pay $25 per First Horizon share. The transaction is expected to be completed in February 2023 and would be the second-largest bank deal in recent U.S history. The combined U.S. entity will be headquartered in Cherry Hill, New Jersey, in the Philadelphia metropolitan area.

References

External links

1864 establishments in Tennessee
American companies established in 1864
Banks based in Tennessee
Banks established in 1864
Companies based in Memphis, Tennessee
Companies listed on the New York Stock Exchange
Announced mergers and acquisitions